The year 1731 in architecture involved some significant events.

Buildings and structures

Buildings

Basilica of Superga in Italy, designed by Filippo Juvarra, is completed.
Cumbernauld House in Scotland, to designs by William Adam, is built.
Hôtel Peyrenc de Moras in Paris, designed by Jean Aubert, is completed.
Jakobstad Church in Finland, designed by Johan Knubb, is built.
Jerusalem's Church in Berlin, designed by Philipp Gerlach, is completed.
Royal Theatre in Mantua, Italy, designed by Ferdinando Galli-Bibiena, is built.
Trooditissa Monastery on Cyprus is built.
Staircase of Schloss Bruchsal in Baden is designed by Balthasar Neumann.

Births
January 13 – Carl von Gontard, German architect (d. 1791)
April 14 – Laurent-Benoît Dewez, Belgian architect (d. 1812)
May 10 – Victor Louis, French architect (d. 1800)
Andrea Giganti, Sicilian Baroque architect (d. 1787)
Approximate date – John Hawks, English-born architect working in the Province of North Carolina (d. 1790)

Deaths
November 6 – James Smith, Scottish architect (b. c.1645)
Francesco de Sanctis, Roman architect (b. 1679)

References

Architecture
Years in architecture
18th-century architecture